Scarborough West was a provincial electoral district in Ontario, Canada. It was created prior to the 1963 provincial election and eliminated in 1996, when its territory was incorporated into the riding of Scarborough Southwest. Scarborough West riding was created from part of the former riding of York—Scarborough. It was in the former borough of Scarborough.

Four Members of Provincial Parliament represented the riding during its history. The most notable was Stephen Lewis who was leader of the New Democratic Party of Ontario from 1970-1978.

Boundaries
The riding was created in 1963 through an amendment to the Representation Act. It formed the southwest part of the former riding of York—Scarborough. The riding was bordered by Lawrence Avenue to the north, Victoria Park Road to the west, Lake Ontario to the south and Kennedy Road to the east.

In 1975, the boundary was significantly altered. The western boundary remained Victoria Park Road and the southern boundary of Lake Ontario were retained. The northern boundary was moved south to Eglinton Avenue. The eastern boundary was redrawn as follows: from Eglinton Avenue, the boundary followed the CNR right-of-way located east of Kennedy Road south and then curving south east to Midland Avenue at Danforth Road. It followed Midland Avenue south to Kingston Road where it turned southwest following Kingston to the Rosetta McLain Gardens park. It then turned south until it met the lake.

In 1987 the boundary was altered again. The northern border was moved north to Lawrence Avenue. The eastern boundary followed the CNR right-of-way east of Kennedy Avenue south to Eglinton Avenue. It then moved west following Eglinton to Kennedy Road. It then followed Kennedy south to Lake Ontario.

Members of Provincial Parliament

Electoral results

1963 boundaries

1975 boundaries

1987 boundaries

References

Notes

Citations

Former provincial electoral districts of Ontario
Provincial electoral districts of Toronto
Scarborough, Toronto